Job control may refer to:

Computing
 Job control (computing), the control of multiple tasks or jobs on a computer system
 Job control (Unix), control of jobs by a shell in Unix and Unix-like operating systems
 Job Control Language, scripting languages used on IBM mainframe operating systems

Other uses
 Job control (workplace), the ability of a person to influence what happens in their work environment